DXUR (97.1 FM), broadcasting as Halo Halo 97.1, is a radio station owned and operated by Viva Live, Inc., a subsidiary of Viva Entertainment. The station's studio and transmitter are located at Unit 49, 4th Floor, Landco Corporate Center Bldg., J.P. Laurel Ave., Bajada, Davao City. It operates daily from 4:00 AM to 10:00 PM.

History

The station was launched in 1996 as UR97 Ultimate Radio, carrying a CHR/Top 40 format. In 2010, after the success of a daily Christian program, the station rebranded as Mango Radio and carried a christian radio format.

In 2013, Viva Live, Inc. acquired the franchises of Ultimate Entertainment Inc., prompting Mango Radio to move its broadcasts online. In January 2015, the station went back on air as Oomph Radio, carrying a CHR/Top 40 format. It was manned by jocks, most of them who used to work with the defunct Mix FM In June 2016, the station rebranded back to UR97 and added 70s, 80s and 90s to its playlist, despite retaining its format. However, the following month, Oomph Radio returned on air. In February 2017, the Oomph Radio brand was retired once again due to management decision.

In May 2017, the station was relaunched as Halo Halo, the first and only FM station in each city playing only Original Pilipino Music.

Halo Halo Stations

References

Radio stations in Davao City
Radio stations established in 1996
OPM formatted radio stations in the Philippines
Viva Entertainment